Sarmada is a town in the Harem District, Idlib Governorate of Syria. It is in the extreme northwest of Syria near the border with Turkey.

A church was consecrated in Sarmada by Patriarch Elias of Antioch in 722 CE. It is also the place in which the Battle of Sarmada took place between the Principality of Antioch and the Artuqids on June 28, 1119.

Monuments

Column of Sarmada
The town is distinguished by the Roman tomb of Alexandras, dated to the second century CE. The tomb is rectangular and supports two columns, composed of thirteen cylicrical stones, joined together at the tenth cylinder by a horizontal piece with a further capital on top.

Monastery of Saint Daniel and Hisn ad-Dair
The Monastery of Saint Daniel (also known as Breij or Braij or al-Breij) is located 2 km west of the town, perched in a hillside location about 400 metres from the road. The monastery is dated to the 6th century CE during the later monastic phase of the Dead Cities.

A monastery called Hisn ad-Dair near Sarmada was given to Alan of Gael by Baldwin II of Jerusalem in 1121 AD, when it was described as a fortified monastery. There is also mention of a castle with three watchtowers in the area.

Roman temple
A further 4 km along the road towards Baqirha is a Roman temple dedicated to Zeus. Epigraphic evidence was found dating the structure to c. 169 CE. The temple features a massive gateway and cella along with one surviving column of what once was a four columned portico.

References

External links

 Column of Sarmada on 3Darchaeology.blogspot.co.uk
 Photo of the Column of Sarmada on Flickr
 Sarmada on Wikimapia
 Images of alleged clandestine excavations being carried out at an archaeological site in Sarmada on the Facebook page of Le patrimoine archéologique syrien en danger

Populated places in Harem District
Ancient Roman temples
Roman sites in Syria
Tourist attractions in Syria
Archaeological sites in Aleppo Governorate